Heavenly Pursuits (knows as Gospel According to Vic in some territories) is a 1986 Scottish comedy film written and directed by Charles Gormley and starring Tom Conti, Helen Mirren, and David Hayman. Set in Glasgow, Scotland, the film is about a teacher at a Catholic school whose students are searching for two more miracles that would promote the late Edith Semple to sainthood. A nonbeliever himself, the teacher's scepticism is challenged when he becomes involved in seemingly miraculous events.

Plot
At the Vatican, Father Cobb (Brian Pettifer) from the Blessed Edith Semple School in Glasgow, offers evidence to promote Blessed Edith's elevation to sainthood. Downplaying the idea of miracles, a Vatican official sends the "little father" back to Scotland. Undeterred, Father Cobb continues to lead the school in prayer, invoking Blessed Edith's intercession to heal the sick, including little Alice McKenzie who is crippled.

Remedial teacher Vic Mathews (Tom Conti) is not a believer in miracles, placing his faith instead in his students and in their ability to learn. He is attracted to the new music teacher, Ruth Chancellor (Helen Mirren), who appears unimpressed with his awkward advances. After fainting at a bus stop, Vic is rushed to the hospital, where tests reveal the presence of a fatal brain tumour. The doctor sees little benefit in telling Vic about his condition.

Meanwhile, the Headmaster (Dave Anderson) complains to the teacher's union representative, Jeff Jeffries (David Hayman), about Vic writing letters to the school board to keep a failed student, Stevie Deans (Ewen Bremner), from being sent to a special school. Convinced he can reach the withdrawn student, Vic refuses to accept the Headmaster's judgement. At a friendly card game at Vic's apartment later that night, Jeff convinces Vic after a few drinks to back off on his letter-writing campaign. After everyone leaves, a drunken Vic witnesses a strange event: his stereo plays without being turned on.

The next day, Vic discovers he is able to teach basic math concepts more effectively by using examples from the gambling world. Even Stevie Deans responds to this new approach, showing he is clearly far from stupid. When Vic reports his progress, however, the Headmaster is more excited about the apparent healing of little Alice McKenzie. That night at a pub, a drunken Vic dismisses the newspaper reports of Alice's miraculous recovery, and just before the conversation turns ugly, Vic faints again. Ruth offers to drive him home, and the next day in church, she prays for Vic, whose tireless teaching efforts soon lead to yet another breakthrough with another "special" student.

Later, Vic is summoned to the roof to rescue a student trapped on an adjacent roof. When he sees the boy slipping, Vic jumps across to the opposite roof, but is unable to prevent the boy from falling 40 feet through a tree that fortunately breaks his fall. Vic also loses his hold and falls from the roof. The student ends up with two broken legs, but Vic escapes with only minor scratches. When Father Cobb calls it a miracle, Vic dismisses the idea, but at the hospital, new x-rays reveal that his brain tumour is gone. The doctor has no explanation and never mentions the tumour to Vic. The hospital administrator orders the x-rays destroyed, but the radiologist holds onto them.

Soon the newspapers report Vic's survived fall and the "miraculous academic improvement" of Stevie Deans. The bishop arrives and is annoyed by all the miracle stories, and Stevie is rushed out of town to a retreat, away from news reporters. School officials announce that there were no miracles involved with the student—just marked improvement based on good teaching. Vic is also trying to convince himself that his survived fall was no miracle. Ruth even takes him to a newspaper office showing him numerous stories of unfounded miracles.

Meanwhile, after seeing Vic dismissing the idea of miracles in a television interview, the radiologist delivers the x-rays to Father Cobb as "definitive proof" that a miracle actually happened—the complete healing of an inoperable brain tumour. Father Cobb considers the legal implications for the radiologist, and then burns the x-rays saying, "We don't need proof—we believe."

The story of Vic's miraculous recovery is soon reported on the news. Confused by what's happened, and told he is "special", Vic goes to the hospital to heal the student's broken legs, but soon realizes his folly. Back at school, Robbie complains to Vic that he wants to be a "special" student too. They go back to the roof where he and Jeff try to explain how Vic was able to make the 17-foot leap. To prove it was not a miracle, Vic makes the jump again. Afterwards, Jeff reveals Stevie Deans' whereabouts, and Vic heads to the railway station to bring Stevie back.

Ruth asks Robbie to help her find Vic, and the two rush off to the railway station, where Ruth and Vic unite in a loving embrace. Robbie stumbles into a crowd and is forced onto a red carpet just as Princess Diana approaches. A photographer hands Robbie some flowers and he offers them to the princess as the worldwide press photographers capture the moment. Vic and Ruth leave by train to bring another "special" student back to school.

Cast

 Tom Conti as Vic Mathews
 Helen Mirren as Ruth Chancellor
 David Hayman as Jeff Jeffries
 Brian Pettifer as Father Cobb
 Jennifer Black as Sister
 Dave Anderson as Headmaster
 Moica Brady as Radiologist
 Ewen Bremner as Stevie Deans
 Tom Busby as Brusse
 Juliet Cadzow as Woman Teacher
 Doreen Cameron as Nurse
 Robert W. Carr as Night Editor
 Fiona Chalmers as Child in Vic's Class
 Margo Croan as Woman at Bus Stop
 Jake D'Arcy as Wee Man in Bar
 Bill Denniston as Bishop
 Ron Donachie as Big Man in Bar
 Mel Donald as 1st Man at Bus Stop

 James Gibb as MacArthur
 Sam Graham as Doctor Knox
 Grace Kirby as French Teacher
 Phillip J. Maxwell as Wee Mike
 Ronnie McCann as Boy on Roof
 David McCormack as James
 Jenny McCrindle as Carole Adams
 Billy McElhaney as Reporter 2
 David McKail as Consultant
 Lawrie McNicol as Reporter 1
 John Mitchell as Gibbons
 Sandy Neilson as 2nd Man at Bus Stop
 Paul Nolan as Robbie
 Robert Peterson as MacKrimmond
 John Shedden as Dentist
 Jay Smith as Photographer
 Carey Wilson as Education Officer
 Kara Wilson as Registrar McAllister

Production

Filming locations
Gospel According to Vic was filmed in various locations throughout Glasgow, Scotland.

 Glasgow Cathedral
 St. Alphonsus Church
 Queen's Park School
 Glasgow Herald
 Glasgow City Chambers (representing the Vatican)
 Glasgow Queen Street railway station

Reception
Gospel According to Vic received positive reviews upon its theatrical release in the United States. In her review in the Washington Post, Rita Kempley called it "a comedy of marvels great and small, proves a timely answer to a moviegoer's prayers." She compared this "sweet-natured and idiosyncratic work" to some of Bill Forsyth's best films. She lauded Tom Conti's performance with his "perfect timing and rumpled magnetism." Kempley concludes, "There's always room for doubt in this delightfully quirky screenplay, with its grumbling atheists and gosh-almighty faithful. Gormley needs no special effects to create his aura of heavenly intervention, relying instead on ambiguous incidents and secondhand testimony."

In his review in The New York Times, Walter Goodman singles out Conti's performance:

Goodman concludes, "Gospel According to Vic may not be a miracle, but it's definitely a blessing."

In their review in Spirituality & Practice, Frederic and Mary Ann Brussat wrote:

References

External links
 
 
 

1986 films
1986 comedy-drama films
English-language Scottish films
Films set in Scotland
Films set in Glasgow
Scottish films
Films about educators
British comedy-drama films
1986 comedy films
1986 drama films
1980s English-language films
1980s British films